Ireland participated in the 2010 Winter Olympics in Vancouver, British Columbia, Canada.

Alpine skiing

Bob-sleigh

An alternate was also sent to Vancouver.
Leona Byrne

Cross-country skiing 

Distance

Skeleton

References

External links 
 Vancouver 2010 

Nations at the 2010 Winter Olympics
2010
Winter Olympics